The Ultra 24 is a family of computer workstations by Sun Microsystems based on the Intel Core 2 processor.

The Sun Ultra 24 launched in 2007, and shipped with Solaris 10 pre-installed. Other than Solaris, it is officially compatible with various flavours of Linux as well as Microsoft's Windows XP and Windows Vista.

Features
 CPU: one Intel Core 2 processor, 2.0 GHz or higher:
 Intel Core 2 Duo processor
 Intel Core 2 Quad processor
 Intel Core 2 Extreme processor 
 Memory—ECC unbuffered DDR2-667 DIMMs, 4 DIMM slots, 8 GB maximum. Three DIMM sizes, 512 MB, 1 GB, and 2 GB
 Networking—Single Gigabit Ethernet integrated on motherboard, one RJ-45 port (rear)
 Hard Disk Drives—Up to four internal drives:
 either up to four SATA drives, 3 TB maximum: 250 GB, 750 GB (7,200 rpm)
 or, with optional PCIe SAS HBA: Up to four SAS drives, 1.2 TB maximum: 146 GB, 300 GB (15,000 rpm)
 Graphics: provided by a PCIe card
 PCI Express Slots:
 Two full-length x16 Gen-2 slots
 One full-length x8 slot (Electrically x4)
 One full-length x1 slot

References

External links
 System Specifications on the Oracle documentation website
 Official Oracle Ultra 24 documentation

See also
Sun Ultra series: various Sun workstations and servers using SPARC, AMD or Intel processors.

Sun workstations